The Unconditional Spanish Party was a loyalist conservative political party in Puerto Rico during Spanish colonial times. It was founded in November 1870. The party favored traditionalist assimilation into the political party system of Spain. It purchased the newspaper Boletín Mercantil to serve as the party's official organ for disseminating its conservative views.  Most of its members belonged to the Puerto Rican Volunteers Corps.

There were no political parties in Puerto Rico until 1870. Partido Incondicional Español was one of two parties formed in Puerto Rico in the early 1870s, the other party being the Partido Liberal Reformista. Partido Incondicional Español represented the conservative side of Puerto Rican politics under the Spanish sovereignty, while Partido Liberal Refomista represented the liberal side. The party existed from 1870 until the end of Spanish sovereignty in Puerto Rico in 1898, when it dissolved. During those 28 years, the party was presided first by Jose Ramon Fernandez, then by Marques de la Esperanza, and last by Pablo Ubarri.

Members
Ángel Rivero Méndez
Manuel Egozcue Cintrón

References

Defunct political parties in Puerto Rico
Political history of Puerto Rico
History of Puerto Rico
Political parties established in 1870
1870 establishments in Puerto Rico
Conservative parties